Mr. Smith Goes to Washington is an American sitcom that aired on ABC starring Fess Parker. The series, which aired from October 1962 to March 1963, was based on the 1939 Frank Capra film of the same name, starring James Stewart in the title role.

Guest stars
Harpo Marx
Buster Keaton
Charles Lane
Jim Nabors
Hope Summers
Kay Starr (at the time, producer Hal Stanley's wife)
Edward Everett Horton
Leo Gorcey
Jack Carter
Cecil Kellaway

Episode list

References

External links

 

1962 American television series debuts
1963 American television series endings
1960s American sitcoms
1960s American political comedy television series
American Broadcasting Company original programming
Black-and-white American television shows
English-language television shows]
Live action television shows based on films
Television series by Sony Pictures Television
Television shows set in Washington, D.C.
Television series by Screen Gems